Cordia Harrington is the CEO of The Bakery Cos.

She was named number 16 of the 25 Top Women Business Builders by FAST Company. She was also named Woman Business Owner of the Year in 2000 by the National Association of Women Business Owners, and named number 16 in FAST Company magazine’s Fastest Growing Woman-Owned Business list in 2004. In 2007, she was named as Executive of the Year at the Excellence in Manufacturing Awards, and that same year she was named Chi Omega’s Malinda Jolley Mortin Woman of Achievement. The Bun Companies were also named in the 2007 list of the “Top 100 WBEs Impacting Supplier Diversity,” and that same year Nashville Bun Company was honored by a visit from then-President George W. Bush. In 2012 she was awarded the Beta Gamma Sigma Medallion for Entrepreneurship.

She established the Bun Lady Scholarship which is awarded annually to entrepreneurship undergraduate or graduate students who are participating in Belmont University’s study abroad programs.

She is a member of the Minnie Pearl Cancer Foundation, Leadership Nashville, Committee of 200, Chi Omega Foundation, the St. Thomas Health Services Fund and the Federal Reserve Bank of Atlanta Board, and is involved with Ronald McDonald House Charities.

References

Year of birth missing (living people)
Living people
American women chief executives
American chief executives of food industry companies
21st-century American women